Guest is a lunar impact crater that is located on the far side of the Moon, just west of the large crater Fermi and north of Izsak. Guest overlies an unnamed crater of similar size to the north, forming a pair.  With its high albedo, the crater is probably young.

The crater is named after the British geologist, vulcanologist and planetary scientist John Guest by the IAU in 2017.

See also
List of people with craters of the Moon named after them

References

External links
AS15-P-9625, high-resolution image of Guest from Apollo 15 panoramic camera
Guest at The Moon Wiki

Impact craters on the Moon